"Momma Miss America" is an instrumental by Paul McCartney from his debut solo album McCartney released in 1970.

Recording 
The song was recorded completely at McCartney's home in St. John's Wood. McCartney said in 1970: "An instrumental recorded completely at home. Made up as I went along – first a sequence of chords, then a melody on top.

McCartney later said of the song, "Originally it was two pieces, but they ran into each other by accident and became one."

Personnel 
 Paul McCartney - piano, bass, acoustic and electric guitars, drums

References 

Paul McCartney songs